Arch Creek may refer to:

Arch Creek, Florida, a former town in Florida.
Arch Creek (Montana), a creek in Montana.
Arch Creek Petroglyphs, Native American rock art in Wyoming.